Saint-Gineys-en-Coiron (before 2020: Saint-Gineis-en-Coiron) is a commune in the Ardèche department in southern France.

Population

See also
Communes of the Ardèche department

References

Communes of Ardèche
Ardèche communes articles needing translation from French Wikipedia